Harold Wilkins may refer to:

Harold T. Wilkins (1891–1960), British journalist and historian
Harold Wilkins (convict), the last juvenile sentenced to the death penalty in the United Kingdom